Senapati Cricket Stadium or Bokaro Cricket Stadium or Bokaro Steel City Cricket Stadium is a sports stadium located in Bokaro Steel City, Jharkhand, India. The stadium has hosted some Ranji and state level cricket matches.  the stadium was ready to host national level matches.

History 
The stadium was constructed in 1995 and is currently maintained by Bokaro Steel Plant. Currently the stadium hosts district level, state level and Inter-Steel Cricket Tournament matches.  the stadium was ready to host national level matches. The stadium fulfils all basic requirements to organise national level cricket matches. P. N. Singh, general secretary of Bokaro District Cricket Association (BDCA) told in an interview– "We are making efforts to get national-level matches like Ranji Trophy here. Since the past two years, the Bis organizing board matches here. In 2011, the stadium hosted match between Jharkhand and Odisha, while 2012 witnessed game between Jharkhand and West Bengal"

References 

Cricket grounds in Jharkhand
Bokaro Steel City
Sports venues completed in 1995
1995 establishments in Bihar
20th-century architecture in India